Love's Awakening is a 1953 West German drama film directed by Hans Heinrich and starring Winnie Markus, Ingrid Andree and Carl Esmond. It was shot at the Spandau Studios in Berlin and on location around the Chiemsee in Bavaria. The film's sets were designed by the art directors Rolf Zehetbauer and Albrecht Hennings.

Cast
 Winnie Markus as Sybill Berg, Pianistin
 Ingrid Andree as Anna, Enkelin des Töpfers Urban
 Carl Esmond as Michael Rainer, Maler
 Rolf von Nauckhoff as Peter von Prahm, Reitlehrer
 Carl Wery as Urban, Töpfer
 Elsa Wagner as Lina, Haushälterin
 Alfred Balthoff as Dr. Pilger, Rechtsanwalt und Notar
 Gisela Fackeldey as Fräulein Schlüter
 Eduard Wenck as Brinkmann
 Hans Emons as Jakob, Reitknecht
 Arthur Wiesner as Arzt
 Paul Bös as Jobst
 Otto Lengwinat as Dr. Döhler
 Günther Lynen as Martin
 Flo Nordhoff as Bender
 Heinz Schwarzlose as Taxator

References

Bibliography 
 Hans-Michael Bock and Tim Bergfelder. The Concise Cinegraph: An Encyclopedia of German Cinema. Berghahn Books, 2009.

External links 
 

1953 films
1953 drama films
German drama films
West German films
1950s German-language films
Films directed by Hans Heinrich
German black-and-white films
1950s German films
Films shot at Spandau Studios
Films shot in Bavaria